Ayoubi Cricket Stadium is a cricket ground in Kabul, Afghanistan.

History
The stadium played host to four first-class cricket matches in the 2019 Ahmad Shah Abdali 4-day Tournament, hosting three matches for the Kabul Region cricket team, in addition to a match between Band-e-Amir Region and Mis Ainak Region. The ground is named for the owner of the Kabul Eagles ( Kabul Region) Abdul Latif Ayoubi.

Records

First-class
Highest team total: 460 all out by Kabul Region v Mis Ainak Region, 2018–19 
Lowest team total: 117 all out by Mis Ainak Region v Kabul Region, as above
Highest individual innings: 172 by Nasir Jamal for Boost Region v Kabul Region, 2018–19
Best bowling in an innings: 8-35 by Naveen-ul-Haq for Kabul Region v Mis Ainak Region, 2018–19 
Best bowling in a match: 8-61 by Naveen-ul-Haq, as above

See also
List of cricket grounds in Afghanistan

References

External links
Ayoubi Cricket Stadium at ESPNcricinfo

Cricket grounds in Afghanistan
Buildings and structures in Kabul